This list of mammals of Belgium shows the IUCN Red List status of mammal species occurring in Belgium. One is endangered, eight are vulnerable, and three are near threatened.

The following tags are used to highlight each species' conservation status as assessed on the respective IUCN Red List published by the International Union for Conservation of Nature:

Some species were assessed using an earlier set of criteria. Species assessed using this system have the following instead of near threatened and least concern categories:

Order: Rodentia (rodents) 

Rodents make up the largest order of mammals, with over 40% of mammalian species. They have two incisors in the upper and lower jaw which grow continually and must be kept short by gnawing.
Suborder: Sciurognathi
Family: Castoridae (beavers)
Genus: Castor
Eurasian beaver, C. fiber 
Family: Sciuridae (squirrels)
Subfamily: Sciurinae
Tribe: Sciurini
Genus: Sciurus
Red squirrel, S. vulgaris 
Family: Gliridae (dormice)
Subfamily: Leithiinae
Genus: Eliomys
Garden dormouse, E. quercinus 
Genus: Muscardinus
 Hazel dormouse, M. avellanarius NT
Subfamily: Glirinae
Genus: Glis
 European edible dormouse, Glis glis LC
Family: Cricetidae
Subfamily: Cricetinae
Genus: Cricetus
European hamster, C. cricetus 
Subfamily: Arvicolinae
Genus: Arvicola
 European water vole, A. amphibius 
Genus: Clethrionomys
 Bank vole, Clethrionomys glareolus LC
Genus: Microtus
 Field vole, Microtus agrestis LC
 Common vole, Microtus arvalis LC
 European pine vole, Microtus subterraneus LC
Family: Muridae (mice, rats, voles, gerbils, hamsters, etc.)
Subfamily: Murinae
Genus: Apodemus
 Yellow-necked mouse, Apodemus flavicollis LC
 Wood mouse, Apodemus sylvaticus LC
Genus: Micromys
 Eurasian harvest mouse, Micromys minutus LC
Genus: Rattus
 Brown rat, Rattus norvegicus
Family: Myocastoridae
Genus: Myocastor
 Coypu, Myocastor coypus introduced

Order: Lagomorpha (lagomorphs) 

The lagomorphs comprise two families, Leporidae (hares and rabbits), and Ochotonidae (pikas). Though they can resemble rodents, and were classified as a superfamily in that order until the early twentieth century, they have since been considered a separate order. They differ from rodents in a number of physical characteristics, such as having four incisors in the upper jaw rather than two.

Family: Leporidae (rabbits, hares)
Genus: Lepus
 European hare, L. europaeus LC
Genus: Oryctolagus
 European rabbit, O. cuniculus  introduced

Order: Erinaceomorpha (hedgehogs and gymnures) 

The order Erinaceomorpha contains a single family, Erinaceidae, which comprise the hedgehogs and gymnures. The hedgehogs are easily recognised by their spines while gymnures look more like large rats.
Family: Erinaceidae (hedgehogs)
Subfamily: Erinaceinae
Genus: Erinaceus
 West European hedgehog, E. europaeus

Order: Soricomorpha (shrews, moles, and solenodons) 

The "shrew-forms" are insectivorous mammals. The shrews and solenodons closely resemble mice while the moles are stout-bodied burrowers.

Family: Soricidae (shrews)
Subfamily: Crocidurinae
Genus: Crocidura
 Bicolored shrew, Crocidura leucodon
 Greater white-toothed shrew, Crocidura russula LC
Subfamily: Soricinae
Tribe: Nectogalini
Genus: Neomys
 Southern water shrew, Neomys anomalus
 Eurasian water shrew, Neomys fodiens
Tribe: Soricini
Genus: Sorex
 Crowned shrew, Sorex coronatus
 Eurasian pygmy shrew, Sorex minutus
Family: Talpidae (moles)
Subfamily: Talpinae
Tribe: Talpini
Genus: Talpa
 European mole, Talpa europaea

Order: Chiroptera (bats) 

The bats' most distinguishing feature is that their forelimbs are developed as wings, making them the only mammals capable of flight. Bat species account for about 20% of all mammals.
Family: Vespertilionidae
Subfamily: Myotinae
Genus: Myotis
Bechstein's bat, M. bechsteini 
Brandt's bat, M. brandti 
Pond bat, M. dasycneme 
Daubenton's bat, M. daubentonii  
Geoffroy's bat, M. emarginatus 
Greater mouse-eared bat, M. myotis 
Whiskered bat, M. mystacinus 
Natterer's bat, M. nattereri 
Subfamily: Vespertilioninae
Genus: Barbastella
Western barbastelle, B. barbastellus 
Genus: Eptesicus
 Northern bat, Eptesicus nilssoni
 Serotine bat, Eptesicus serotinus
Genus: Nyctalus
Common noctule, N. noctula 
Lesser noctule, N. leisleri 
Genus: Pipistrellus
Nathusius' pipistrelle, P. nathusii 
 Common pipistrelle, P. pipistrellus LC
Genus: Plecotus
Brown long-eared bat, P. auritus 
 Grey long-eared bat, P. austriacus
Family: Rhinolophidae
Subfamily: Rhinolophinae
Genus: Rhinolophus
Greater horseshoe bat, R. ferrumequinum  extirpated
Lesser horseshoe bat, R. hipposideros

Order: Cetacea (whales) 

The order Cetacea includes whales, dolphins and porpoises. They are the mammals most fully adapted to aquatic life with a spindle-shaped nearly hairless body, protected by a thick layer of blubber, and forelimbs and tail modified to provide propulsion underwater.

Suborder: Mysticeti
Family: Balaenidae (right whales)
Genus: Balaena
 Bowhead whale, Balaena mysticetus LC vagrant
Genus: Eubalaena
 North Atlantic right whale, Eubalaena glacialis EN almost extinct in eastern North Atlantic
Family: Megapterinae (humpback whales)
Genus: Megaptera
 Humpback whale, Megaptera novaeangliae LC
Family: Balaenopteridae
Subfamily: Balaenopterinae (rorquals)
Genus: Balaenoptera
 Fin whale, Balaenoptera physalus EN
 Minke whale, Balaenoptera acutorostrata LR/nt
Suborder: Odontoceti
Superfamily: Platanistoidea
Family: Physeteridae
Genus: Physeter (sperm whales)
 Sperm whale, Physeter macrocephalus VU
Family: Kogiidae 
Genus: Kogia (pygmy sperm whales)
 Pygmy sperm whale, Kogia breviceps LR/lc
Family: Monodontidae
Genus: Delphinapterus (beluga and narwhals)
 Beluga, Delphinapterus leucas VU
Family: Phocoenidae
Genus: Phocoena (harbor porpoises)
 Harbour porpoise, Phocoena phocoena VU
Family: Ziphidae
Subfamily: Hyperoodontinae
Genus: Mesoplodon (beaked whales)
 Sowerby's beaked whale, Mesoplodon bidens DD
Family: Delphinidae (marine dolphins)
 Genus: Lagenorhynchus
 White-beaked dolphin, Lagenorhynchus albirostris LR/lc
 Genus: Leucopleurus
 Atlantic white-sided dolphin, Leucopleurus acutus LR/lc
Genus: Stenella
 Striped dolphin, Stenella coeruleoalba LR/cd
Genus: Tursiops
 Common bottlenose dolphin, Tursiops truncatus
Genus: Delphinus
 Short-beaked common dolphin, Delphinus delphis LR/lc
 Long-beaked common dolphin, Delphinus capensis
Genus: Steno
 Rough-toothed dolphin, Steno bredanensis
Genus: Grampus
 Risso's dolphin, Grampus griseus DD
Genus: Globicephala
 Pilot whale, Globicephala melas LR/lc
Genus: Orcinus
 Killer whale, Orcinus orca
Genus: Pseudorca
 False killer whale, Pseudorca crassidens

Order: Carnivora (carnivorans) 

There are over 260 species of carnivorans, the majority of which feed primarily on meat. They have a characteristic skull shape and dentition.
Suborder: Feliformia
Family: Felidae (cats)
Subfamily: Felinae
Genus: Felis
 European wildcat, F. silvestris 
Family: Viverridae
Subfamily: Viverrinae
Genus: Genetta
 Common genet, G. genetta  introduced, presence uncertain
Suborder: Caniformia
Family: Canidae (dogs, foxes)
Genus:Canis
Gray wolf, C. lupus 
Genus: Vulpes
Red fox, V. vulpes 
Family: Ursidae (bears)
Genus: Ursus
Brown bear, U. arctos  presence uncertain
Family: Mustelidae (mustelids)
Genus: Lutra
European otter, L. lutra NT
Genus: Martes
Beech marten, M. foina 
European pine marten, M. martes 
Genus: Meles
European badger, M. meles LC
Genus: Mustela
Stoat, M. erminea 
Least weasel, M. nivalis 
European polecat, M. putorius 
Genus: Neogale
American mink, N. vison  presence uncertain, introduced
Family: Phocidae (earless seals)
Genus: Phoca
 Common seal, P. vitulina LC
Genus: Halichoerus
 Grey seal, H. grypus

Order: Artiodactyla (even-toed ungulates) 

The even-toed ungulates are ungulates whose weight is borne about equally by the third and fourth toes, rather than mostly or entirely by the third as in perissodactyls. There are about 220 artiodactyl species, including many that are of great economic importance to humans.
Family: Cervidae (deer)
Subfamily: Capreolinae
Genus: Capreolus
Roe deer, C. capreolus 
Subfamily: Cervinae
Genus: Cervus
Red deer, C. elaphus 
Genus: Dama
 European fallow deer, D. dama LC introduced
Family: Suidae (pigs)
Subfamily: Suinae
Genus: Sus
Wild boar, S. scrofa

Locally extinct 
 European bison, Bison bonasus

References

External links

See also
List of chordate orders
Lists of mammals by region
List of prehistoric mammals
Mammal classification
List of mammals described in the 2000s

Belgium
Mammals
Mammals
Belgium